The 2005 Bahrain GP2 Series round was a GP2 Series motor race held on September 29 and 30, 2005 at the Bahrain International Circuit in Sakhir, Bahrain. It was the final showdown of the 2005 GP2 Series season. The race weekend was a stand-alone event unlike the previous GP2 rounds which support Formula One Grands Prix.

Background
Coming into the final round of the season, Nico Rosberg held a five-point lead in the driver's championship from Heikki Kovalainen with 22 points up for grabs in the final round at the Bahrain International Circuit.

Classification

Qualifying

 Nelson Piquet Jr. and Adam Carroll had their two fastest times deleted for speeding under yellow flags during Q2. Piquet had been due to start from 7th and Carroll 11th start grid.

Feature race

Sprint race

 Oliver Pla was unable to start the race due to an gearbox failure.
 Scott Speed started the race from the pitlane.

Standings after the round

Drivers' Championship standings

Teams' Championship standings

 Note: Only the top five positions are included for both sets of standings.

References

External links 
 Motorsportstats.com

Bahrain
GP2